The 2020 Sacramento Republic FC season was the club's seventh season of existence. The club played in the USL Championship (USL-C), the second tier of the American soccer pyramid. Sacramento Republic FC competed in the Western Conference of the USL Championship. This article covers the period from November 18, 2019, the day after the 2019 USL-C Playoff Final, to the conclusion of the 2020 USL-C Playoff Final, scheduled for November 12–16, 2020.

Club

Roster

Staff

Competitions

Exhibitions

USL Championship

Standings — Group A

Match results

In the preparations for the resumption of league play following the shutdown prompted by the COVID-19 pandemic, the remainder of Republic FC's schedule was announced on July 2.

USL Cup Playoffs

U.S. Open Cup 

As a USL Championship club, Sacramento will enter the competition in the Second Round, to be played April 7–9.

References

Sacramento Republic FC seasons
Sacramento Republic FC
Sacramento Republic FC
Sacramento Republic FC